Water polo events were contested at the 2005 Summer Universiade in İzmir, Turkey.

References
 Universiade water polo medalists on HickokSports

2005 Summer Universiade
Universiade
2005
2005